Ashraf Khan Khattak was the eldest son of Khushal Khan Khattak and ruler of the Khattak clan for a time.

Life
He was born in 1634 (H.1044). He became chieftain of the Khattak clan in 1693 after his father, Khushal, resigned after the war against the Mughal Emperor ended. He died in 1693, aged 60.

Chief of the Khattak clan
Ashraf endeavoured for some time to carry on the government of his clan, and also to perform his duties towards the Mughal Government, by aiding the Peshawar authorities in the administration of the affairs of that province; but he was opposed and thwarted in all his endeavours by his brother Bahram, the same who endeavoured to take the life of his father; who styles him “Bahram the Degenerate,” and “The Malignant ;“ and by whose machinations Ashraf was, at last, betrayed into the hands of Aurangzeb, in 1683. The affairs of the Dakhan having called for the presence of that monarch, who continued in that part of India for several years the Khattak chief was taken along with him, as a state prisoner; and was subsequently sent to the strong fortress of Bijapur, situated in what is, at present, termed the Southern Maharata country, where he continued to languish in exile for the remainder of his life.

Poetry
Ashraf used to devote some of his leisure time to poetry, before he assumed the government of his clan, incited, doubtless, by the example of his brave old father, and his brothers Abd-ul-Kadir and Sadr Khan, who were also gifted with the “cacoëthes scribendi.” During his exile he wrote a great number of poems, and collected the whole, as they now stand, in the form of a Diwan, or Alphabetical Collection. According to the usual custom among Eastern poets, Ashraf assumed the name of “The Severed” or “Exiled;" and many of his poems, written in the most pathetic style, plainly tell where, and under what circumstances, they were composed. The original Diwan, or Collection, arranged and written by himself, at Bijapür, is still in the possession of his descendants.

References 

1634 births
1693 deaths
Pashtun people